is a former Japanese football player.

Playing career
Uemura was born in Shiga Prefecture on April 9, 1964. After graduating from Doshisha University, he joined Matsushita Electric (later Gamba Osaka) in 1987. In 1990, the club won the champions Emperor's Cup first major title in the club history. In J.League first season in 1993, he played opening match against Urawa Reds on May 16. He played as defender in 5 consecutive games from the opening game. However he could hardly play in the match after that and retired end of 1993 season.

Club statistics

References

External links

1964 births
Living people
Doshisha University alumni
Association football people from Shiga Prefecture
Japanese footballers
Japan Soccer League players
J1 League players
Gamba Osaka players
Association football defenders